This is a list of the National Register of Historic Places listings in Custer County, Idaho.

This is intended to be a complete list of the properties and districts on the National Register of Historic Places in Custer County, Idaho, United States.  Latitude and longitude coordinates are provided for many National Register properties and districts; these locations may be seen together in a map.

There are 38 properties and districts listed on the National Register in the county.  More may be added; properties and districts nationwide are added to the Register weekly.

Current listings

|}

See also
 List of National Historic Landmarks in Idaho
 National Register of Historic Places listings in Idaho

References

Custer